The Sealdah–Varanasi Express is an Express train belonging to Eastern Railway zone that runs between  and  in India. It is currently being operated with 13133/13134 train numbers. It runs from Varanasi on Monday, Tuesday, Thursday, Friday. From Sealdah MON TUE WED FRI SAT

Service

The 13133/Sealdah–Varanasi (Upper India) Express has an average speed of 36 km/hr and covers 872 km in 24h 25m. 13134/Varanasi–Sealdah (Upper India) Express has an average speed of 33 km/hr and covers 872 km in 26h 15m.

Route and halts 

The important halts of the train are:

Coach composition

The train has standard LCF rakes with max speed of 110 kmph. The train consists of 16 coaches :

 2 AC III Tier
 6 Sleeper coaches
 6 General
 2 Seating cum Luggage Rake

Traction

Both trains are hauled by a Barddhaman Loco Shed-based WDM-3A diesel locomotive from Sealdah to Varanasi and vice versa.

Running status

13134 – leaves at 8:40 hrs from Varanasi Jn every Monday, Tuesday, Thursday, Friday and reaches 2nd day at 10:55 hrs IST at Sealdah

13133 – leaves Sealdah at 21:15 hrs every Monday, Tuesday, Wednesday, Friday, Saturday and reaches Varanasi Jn at 21:40                                                           hrs IST on 2nd day.

See also 
 Varanasi Junction railway station
 Sealdah railway station

Notes

References

External links 
 13133/Sealdah–Varanasi (Upper India) Express
 13134/Varanasi–Sealdah (Upper India) Express

Passenger trains originating from Varanasi
Transport in Kolkata
Express trains in India
Rail transport in West Bengal
Rail transport in Jharkhand
Rail transport in Bihar